Michael Hofmann (born 25 August 1957) is a German-born poet who writes in English and is a translator of texts from German.

Biography
Hofmann was born in Freiburg into a family with a literary tradition. His father was the German novelist Gert Hofmann. His maternal grandfather edited the Brockhaus Enzyklopädie. Hofmann's family first moved to Bristol in 1961, and later to Edinburgh. He was educated at Winchester College, and then studied English Literature and Classics at Magdalene College, Cambridge, graduating with a BA in 1979. 

In 1983, Hofmann started working as a freelance writer, translator, and literary critic. 
He has since gone on to hold visiting professorships at the University of Michigan, Rutgers University, the New School University, Barnard College, and Columbia University. He was first a visitor to the University of Florida in 1990, joined the faculty in 1994, and became full-time in 2009. He has been teaching poetry and translation workshops.

In 2008, Hofmann was Poet-in-Residence in the state of Queensland in Australia.

Hofmann has two sons, Max (1991) and Jakob (1993). He splits his time between Hamburg and Gainesville, Florida.

Honours
Hofmann received the Cholmondeley Award in 1984 for Nights in the Iron Hotel and the Geoffrey Faber Memorial Prize in 1988 for Acrimony. The same year, he also received the Schlegel-Tieck Prize for his translation of Patrick Süskind's Der Kontrabaß (The Double Bass). In 1993 he received the Schlegel-Tieck Prize again for his translation of Wolfgang Koeppen's Death in Rome.

Hofmann was awarded the Independent Foreign Fiction Prize in 1995 for the translation of his father's novel The Film Explainer, and Michael was nominated again in 2003 for his translation of Peter Stephan Jungk's The Snowflake Constant. In 1997 he received the Arts Council Writer's Award for his collection of poems Approximately Nowhere, and the following year he received the International Dublin Literary Award for his translation of Herta Müller's novel The Land of Green Plums.

In 1999, Hofmann was awarded the PEN/Book-of-the-Month Club Translation Prize for his translation of Joseph Roth's The String of Pearls. In 2000, Hofmann was selected as the recipient of the Helen and Kurt Wolff Translator's Prize for his translation of Joseph Roth's novel Rebellion (Die Rebellion). In 2003 he received another Schlegel-Tieck Prize for his translation of his father's Luck, and in 2004 he was awarded the Oxford-Weidenfeld Translation Prize for his translation of Ernst Jünger's Storm of Steel. In 2005 Hofmann received his fourth Schlegel-Tieck Prize for his translation of Gerd Ledig's The Stalin Organ. Hofmann served as a judge for the Griffin Poetry Prize in 2002, and in 2006 Hofmann made the Griffin's international shortlist for his translation of Durs Grünbein's Ashes for Breakfast.

Critical Writing
Hofmann has a reputation for writing negative review essays. Philip Oltermann remarks on the "savagery" with which Hofmann "can wield a hatchet", stating (with reference to Hofmann's dislike for Stefan Zweig) that: "Like a Soho drunk stumbling into the National Portrait Gallery in search of a good scrap, Hofmann has battered posthumous reputations with the same glee as those of the living."

Selected bibliography

Author

 
 
 
 
 
 
Hofmann, Michael (2018), One Lark, One Horse, London: Faber and Faber, Messing About in Boats (Oxford University Press, 2021)
Articles
 Hofmann, Michael, "Heine's Heartmobile" (review of George Prochnik, Heinrich Heine: Writing the Revolution, Yale University Press, 2020, 312 pp.), The New York Review of Books, vol. LXVIII, no. 12 (22 July 2021), pp. 42–44.

Translator
 
 
 
 
 
 
 
 

 
 
 
 
 
 
 
 
 
 
 
 
 
 Kafka, Franz; Hofmann, Michael (2006), The Zürau aphorisms, New York: Schocken, 
 
 Kafka, Franz; Hofmann, Michael (2007), Metamorphosis and other stories, New York: Penguin Classics, 
 
 
 
 
Canetti, Elias; Hofmann, Michael (2010), Party in the Blitz, New Directions
Roth, Joseph; Hofmann, Michael (2011), The Leviathan, New Directions
 
 
Roth, Joseph; Hofmann, Michael (2013), The Emperor's Tomb, New Directions
Roth, Joseph, Hofmann, Michael (2015), The Hotel Years, New Directions
Kafka, Franz; Hofmann, Michael (2017), Investigations of a Dog & Other Creatures, New Directions
Döblin, Alfred; Hofmann, Michael (2018), Berlin Alexanderplatz, New York Review Books
Kleist, Heinrich von; Hofmann, Michael (2020), Michael Kohlhaas, New Directions
Koeppen, Wolfgang; Hofmann, Michael (2020), Pigeons on the Grass, New Directions
Kafka, Franz; Hofmann, Michael (2020), The Lost Writings'', New Directions

Editor

Notes

External links
 Hofmann's faculty page at the University of Florida
 
 Griffin Poetry Prize biography
 Griffin Poetry Prize reading, including video clip

1957 births
German–English translators
Living people
Alumni of Magdalene College, Cambridge
University of Florida faculty
German-language poets